South Asian ethnic groups are an ethnolinguistic grouping of the diverse populations of South Asia, including the nations of India, Pakistan, Bangladesh, Nepal, Bhutan,  the Maldives, and Sri Lanka. While Afghanistan is variously considered to be part of both Central Asia and South Asia, Afghans are generally not included among South Asians. 

The majority of the population fall within three large linguistic groups: Indo-Aryan, Dravidian, and Iranic. The Indian, Nepalese, and Sri Lankan societies are traditionally divided into castes or clans, which are based primarily on labour divisions; these categories have had no official status in India since independence in 1947, except for the scheduled castes and tribes, which remain registered for the purpose of affirmative action. In today's India, the population is categorised in terms of the 1,652 mother tongues spoken.

These groups are also further subdivided into numerous sub-groups, castes and tribes. Indo-Aryans form the predominant ethnolinguistic group in India (North India, East India, West India, and Central India), Bangladesh, Pakistan, Nepal, Sri Lanka, and the Maldives. Dravidians form the predominant ethnolinguistic group in southern India, the northern and eastern regions of Sri Lanka and a small pocket of Pakistan. The Iranic peoples also have a significant presence in South Asia, the large majority of whom are located in Pakistan.

Minority groups not falling within either large group mostly speak languages belonging to the Austroasiatic and Tibeto-Burman language families, and largely live around Ladakh and Northeast India, Nepal, Bhutan, and the Chittagong Hill Tracts of Bangladesh. The Andamanese (Sentinel, Onge, Jarawa, and Great Andamanese) live in some of the Andaman Islands and speak a language isolate, as do the Kusunda in central Nepal, the Vedda in Sri Lanka, and the Nihali of Central India, who number about 5,000 people. The people of the Hunza Valley in Pakistan are another distinct population; they speak Burushaski, a language isolate.

The traditions of different ethnic groups in South Asia have diverged, influenced by external cultures, especially in the northwestern parts of South Asia and also in the border regions and busy ports, where there are greater levels of contact with external cultures. There is also a lot of genetic diversity within the region. For example, most of the ethnic groups of the northeastern parts of South Asia are genetically related to peoples of East or Southeast Asia. There are also genetically isolated groups who have not been genetically influenced by other groups, such as the Jarawa people of the Andaman Islands. The largest ethnolinguistic group in South Asia are the Indo-Aryans, numbering around 1 billion, and the largest sub-group are the native speakers of Hindi languages, numbering more than 470 million.

These groups are based solely on a linguistic basis and not on a genetic basis.

List of ethnic groups on the basis of language

Andamanese groups
Great Andamanese of the Andaman and Nicobar Islands
Jangil of the Andaman and Nicobar Islands
Jarawa of the Andaman and Nicobar Islands
Onge of the Andaman and Nicobar Islands
Sentinelese of the Andaman and Nicobar Islands

Austroasiatic people
Khasi people
Pnar/Jaintia
Munda peoples
Bhumij people
Bonda people
Ho people
Juang people
Kharia people
Korku people
Mahle people
Munda people
Santali people
Sora people
Nicobarese people
Shompen people

Austronesian people
Sri Lankan Malays
Urak Lawoi
Moken

Dravidian people 
Badagas
Brahui people
Dongria Kondha
Gondi people
Irulas
Kannadigas
Khonds
Kodava
Kurukh/Oraon
Malayali
Malto people
Sauria Paharia people
Tamil people
Indian Tamils
Indian Tamils of Sri Lanka
Sri Lankan Tamils
Telugu people
Toda people
Tuluvas

Indo-Aryan people

 Assamese people
Awadhi people
Banjara people
Bhojpuri people
Bengali people
Bhil people

Chitrali people
Deccani people
Dhivehi people
Dogra people
Garhwali people
Gujarati people
Haryanvi people
Kalash people
Kamrupi people
Kashmiri people
Khas people
Konkani people
Kumaoni people
Kutchi people
Maithili people
Maldivian people
Marathi people
Magahi people
Meena people
Muhajir people
Nagpuria people
Odia people
Pahari people
Punjabi people
Rajasthani people
Marwaris
Rohingya people
Sindhi people
Memons
Saraiki people
Saurashtra people
Sinhalese people
Shina people
Sylheti people 
Tharu people

Iranic people
Baloch people
Hazara people
Irani people
Tajik people
Pashtun people
Rohilla people

Nuristani people
Nuristani people
Kata people
Kom people
Mumo people

Semitic people
Arabs or mixed Arab and Indo-Aryan or Dravidian
Arabs in Gujarat
Sri Lankan Moors (trace ancestry to Arab traders who settled in Sri Lanka)
Iraqi biradri - a community of Muslims in north India (trace ancestry from Arab tribe of Bani Tamim)
Labbay Arab traders who settled in South India
Konkani Muslims trace their ancestry to Arab traders.
Mappila Muslims trace their ancestry to Arab traders.
Boras trace ancestors to Arab traders and merchants.
Chaush trace ancestors to traders from Yemen.
Syrian Malabar Nasranis are descendants of both Brahmin, Nair and Jewish converts to Christianity. (Some mixed later with Persians and Europeans later on)
Knanaya Syriac Christians who trace their origins to Mesopotamia 
Indian Jews
Cochin Jews (Malayali Jews)
Bene Israel  (Marathi Jews)
Baghdadi Jews (Arab Jews in Bengal)
Bnei Menashe (Mizo and Kuki Jews)
Bene Ephraim (Telugu Jews)
Paradesi Jews (European Jews in India)

Tai people
Ahom people
Tai Aiton
Tai Phake or Tai Phakial

Tibeto-Burman people
Bodo–Kachari people
Bodo
Dimasa
Garo
Hajong
Sonowal
Sutiya
Chepang
Chakma
Gurung
Khowa
Kirati people
Rai
Limbu
Yakkha, Sunuwar
Lepcha people
Magar people
Memba
Meitei people (Manipuri people) 
Naga people
Anāl people
Angami Naga
Southern Angami
Ao Naga
Chakhesang Naga
Chang Naga
Chiru Naga
Chothe people
Khiamniungan Naga
Konyak Naga
Lainong Naga
Lamkang people
Lotha Naga
Mao people
Maram people
Maring people
Monsang people
Moyon Naga
Nocte Naga
Para Naga
Poumai people
Phom Naga
Pochury Naga
Rengma Naga
Sangtam Naga
Sümi Naga
Tangkhul people
Tangsa Naga
Tarao people
Thangal people
Tikhir Naga
Tutsa Naga
Wancho Naga
Yimkhiung Naga
Chirr Naga
Makury Naga
Zeliangrong
Inpui people
Liangmai people
Rongmei people
Zeme Naga
Newar people
Nishi
Tamang
Thakali
Tibetans and Tibetan-speaking peoples
Tibetan Ladakhis
Uttarakhandi Bhotiya
Sikkimese people
Bhutias
Monpa
Takpa
Tshangla
Sherpas
Bhotiyas
Sherdukpen
Aka
Miji
Tibetan Muslim
Burig
Baltis
Tripuri
Karbi people or Mikir
Thami
Zo people
Bawm people
Chin
Kuki
Halam
Hrangkhol
Mizo

Turkic peoples
Turkish Indian
Rowther are alleged descendants of Seljuk Turks in Turko-Persian tradition. They have since become the tradition of Turko-Indian in 12th Century.
Mughal (Moghul) (A Sunni Islamic dynasty of Asia which originated in Central Asia)
Chughtai Tartars (Those people who originated in Uzbekistan and fought for Chagatai Khan who was son of Genghis Khan).
Barlas (A Turkified Mongol tribe to which Babur belonged)
Changezi (Those who were in army of Hulagu Khan)

Afro-Asian groups 
Chaush
Sheedis/Siddis, an ethnic community of Black African descent, found primarily in Pakistan, Gujarat, and Karnataka.
Sri Lanka Kaffirs

European and Eurasian people
Anglo-Burmese
Anglo-Indian
Bangladeshi-Armenians
Dhakaiya Armenians
Burgher people
French-Indian
Luso-Indian
Romani people
Eurasians

East Asian people

Chinese
Bangladeshi Chinese
Indian Chinese
Sri Lankan Chinese

Linguistically isolate groups
 Hunza people
 Kusunda
 Nahali
 Vedda

Diaspora
Many South Asian ethnic groups and nationalities have substantial diasporas outside of South Asia.
South Asian American
Bangladeshi American
Bengali American
Gujarati American
Indian American
Nepalese American
Pakistani American
Punjabi American
Sri Lankan American
Tamil American
Telugu American
South Asian Canadian
Bangladeshi Canadian
Indo-Canadian
Nepalese Canadian
Pakistani Canadian
Sri Lankan Canadian
Tamil Canadian
British Asian
British Bangladeshi
British Indian
British Nepalese
British Pakistani
British Tamil
Sri Lankans in the United Kingdom
British Indo-Caribbean community
Mauritians in the United Kingdom
Asian-Scots
South Asian Australian
Bangladeshi Australian
Indian Australian
Nepalese Australian
Pakistani Australian
Sri Lankan Australian
Indo Kiwi
Indians in Singapore
Malaysian Indian
Tamil Malaysians
Chitty
Nepalis in Singapore
Nepalese people in Malaysia
Indian Indonesian
Indo-Mauritian
Bihari Mauritian
Indo-Caribbean
Indians in Barbados
Indians in Belize
Indians in the Dominican Republic
Indians in French Guiana
Indo-Grenadians
Indians in Guadeloupe
Indo-Guyanese
Indo-Haitians
Indo-Jamaican
Indo-Martiniquais
Indo-Saint Lucian
Indo-Surinamese
Indo-Trinidadian and Tobagonian
Indo-Vincentian
Indians in South America
Indians in Argentina
Indians in Brazil
Indians in Panama
Indians in Venezuela
Burmese Indians
South Asians in Hong Kong
South Asians in the Philippines
Indians in Germany
Nepalis in Germany
Indian South Africans
Tamil South Africans
Indians in Botswana
Indians in Kenya
Indians in Madagascar
Indo-Mauritian
Bihari Mauritian
Indians in Mozambique
Indo-Réunionnaise
Indo-Seychellois
Indians in Tanzania
Indians in Uganda
Indians in Zambia
Indians in Zimbabwe
Indians in Iran
Indians in Thailand
Indians in the United Arab Emirates
Indians in Vietnam
Indians in Panama
Indian diaspora in France
Indians in Israel
Indians in Italy
Indians in Portugal
Indian community in Spain
Indo-Fijian
South Indians in Fiji
Indians in New Caledonia

See also Bangladeshi diaspora, Indian diaspora, Nepalese diaspora, Pakistani diaspora, Punjabi diaspora, Sri Lankan Tamil diaspora, Tamil diaspora.

Two (or possibly three) other people groups have ethnic and linguistic ties with the region:
Dom people
Romani people
Lom people (who speak a language both related to Indo-Aryan and Armenian)

See also
Languages of South Asia
Languages of Bangladesh
Languages of Bhutan
Languages of India
Languages of Maldives
Languages of Nepal
Languages of Pakistan
Languages of Sri Lanka
List of ethnolinguistic regions of South Asia
List of indigenous peoples of South Asia
List of Scheduled Tribes in India
Scheduled Castes and Scheduled Tribes
Non-resident Indian and person of Indian origin
Non Resident Nepali
Overseas Pakistani
Desi
Ethnic groups in Pakistan
Ethnic groups in Nepal
Genetics and archaeogenetics of South Asia
Y-DNA haplogroups in populations of South Asia

National demographics:
Demographics of Bangladesh
Demographics of Bhutan
Demographics of India
Demographics of the Maldives
Demographics of Nepal
Demographics of Pakistan
Demographics of Sri Lanka

References

16. Vij SB, Webb ML. Culturally competent occupational therapy practice for South Asians in the United States of America: A narrative review. Indian J Occup Ther 2022;54:4-9.

External links

Ethnic groups in Pakistan